Martin Ridge (May 7, 1923 - Sept. 22, 2003) was an American historian and director of research at the Huntington Library. He is particularly known for the 1982 5th edition of "Westward expansion: a history of the American frontier" co-authored with Ray Allen Billington.

Biography 
Born and raised in Chicago, Ridge attended Francis W Parker School. He wanted to become an elementary school teacher, and obtained his BEd at the Chicago Teachers College, now Chicago State University in 1943. After serving in the United States Merchant Marine in World War II, he continued his studies at Northwestern University, where he obtained his PhD in 1951 under Ray Allen Billington with the thesis, Ignatius Donnelly: The Making of a Tribune. In 1962 the work was revised and expanded, and was published as Ignatius Donnelly: Portrait of a Politician.
 
After graduation in 1951 Ridge embarked upon his academic career as lecturer at Westminster College. In 1955 he moved to San Diego State University; from 1966 to 1977 he taught at Indiana University, where he edited the Journal of American History. In 1977 he moved to southern California when he was appointed director of research at Huntington Library, and joined the California Institute of Technology faculty. Ridge served at the Huntington Library until his retirement in 1993, and at Caltech until 1995.

Ridge was editor of the Journal of American History (JAH) from 1966 to 1978. He was awarded a Guggenheim Fellowships in 1965. He co-founded the Western History Association in 1961 and served as its president.

Selected publications 
 Ray Allen Billington, Martin Ridge. Western Expansion: A History of the American Frontier. UNM Press. 1949; 2002.
 Martin Ridge. Ignatius Donnelly: The Portrait of a Politician. PhD thesis revised and expanded, University of Chicago Press. 1962.
 Annenberg School of Communications (University of Southern California). Center for Study of the American Experience, & Ridge, M. (1981). The New Bilingualism: An American Dilemma: Proceedings of a Conference Sponsored by Center for Study of the American Experience, the Annenberg School of Communications, University of Southern California, May 1980. Los Angeles, Calif.: University of Southern California Press; New Brunswick, NJ.

Articles, a selection:
 Ridge, Martin. "The Life of an Idea: The Significance of Frederick Jackson Turner's Frontier Thesis." Montana: The Magazine of Western History (1991): 2-13.
 Ridge, Martin. "The American West: From Frontier to Region." New Mexico Historical Review 64.2 (1989).

References

External links 
 Martin Ridge (1923-2003) - American Historical Association Martin Ridge (1923-2003), American Historical Association

1923 births
2003 deaths
20th-century American historians
American male non-fiction writers
20th-century American non-fiction writers
Chicago State University alumni
Northwestern University alumni
Westminster College (Pennsylvania) faculty
San Diego State University faculty
California Institute of Technology faculty
People from Chicago
People associated with the Huntington Library
Historians from Illinois
20th-century American male writers
United States Merchant Mariners of World War II